Canada's National Airport System (NAS) was defined in the National Airports Policy published in 1994. It was intended to include all airports with an annual traffic of 200,000 passengers or more, as well as airports serving the national, provincial and territorial capitals.

All airports in the NAS, with the exception of the three territorial capitals, are owned by Transport Canada and leased to the local authorities operating them. The three territorial airports are owned and, with the exception of Iqaluit Airport, are operated by their respective territorial governments. Iqaluit is operated by Nunavut Airport Services, a subsidiary of Winnipeg Airport Services Corporation, which in turn is a subsidiary of Winnipeg Airports Authority.

As of 1994, the 26 NAS airports served 94% of all scheduled passenger and cargo traffic in Canada.

Due to very close proximity to Canada's east coast, the airports on the islands of Saint Pierre and Miquelon (an overseas collectivity of France) cooperate with Canada on air travel via several major Canadian airports.

NAS airports
The following list contains the 26 NAS airports effective 17 April 2010, along with their IATA codes and passenger numbers for 2014:

 Alberta
 Calgary International Airport, YYC, 14,666,729
 Edmonton International Airport, YEG, 8,240,161
 British Columbia
 Kelowna International Airport, YLW, 1,607,991
 Prince George Airport, YXS, 435,128
 Vancouver International Airport, YVR, 18,944,527
 Victoria International Airport, YYJ, 1,634,887
 Manitoba
 Winnipeg James Armstrong Richardson International Airport, YWG, 3,626,250
 New Brunswick
 Fredericton International Airport, YFC, 248,740 (2007)
 Greater Moncton International Airport, YQM, 649,427
 Saint John Airport, YSJ, 220,007 (2010)
 Newfoundland and Labrador 
 Gander International Airport, YQX, 115,382
 St. John's International Airport, YYT, 1,329,239
 Northwest Territories
 Yellowknife Airport, YZF, 359,384
 Nova Scotia
 Halifax Stanfield International Airport, YHZ, 3,620,107
 Nunavut
 Iqaluit Airport, YFB, 140,563 (2011)
 Ontario
 London International Airport, YXU, 479,928
 Ottawa Macdonald–Cartier International Airport, YOW, 4,472,365
 Thunder Bay International Airport, YQT, 739,837
 Toronto Pearson International Airport, YYZ, 37,523,366
 Prince Edward Island
 Charlottetown Airport, YYG, 317,150
 Quebec
 Montréal–Pierre Elliott Trudeau International Airport, YUL, 14,174,375
 Montréal Mirabel International Airport, YMX, no commercial passengers
 Québec City Jean Lesage International Airport, YQB, 1,449,413
 Saskatchewan
 Regina International Airport, YQR, 1,254,933
 Saskatoon John G. Diefenbaker International Airport, YXE, 1,497,579
 Yukon 
 Erik Nielsen Whitehorse International Airport, YXY, 263,401

References

External links
 National Airports Policy

 
Airports in Canada